[[File:Miles Stapleton of Bedale Arms.svg|thumb|200px|Arms of Stapleton: Argent, a lion rampant sable]]
Sir Miles Stapleton, KG (c. 1408 – 1 October 1466) was Lord of the Manor of Ingham, Norfolk and de jure Baron Ingham of Ingham, Norfolk, and Lord of the Manor of Bedale, Yorkshire.

Family
Sir Miles Stapleton was the son of Sir Brian Stapleton, of Ingham (1379–1438), Sheriff of Norfolk, a veteran of the Battle of Agincourt, and Cecily Bardolf (d. 1432), daughter to William Bardolf, 4th Baron Bardolf, of Wormegay, Norfolk, and Agnes de Poynings. He did homage for his paternal inheritance on 2 February 1440.

Sir Miles Stapleton married firstly Elizabeth Felbrigge, daughter of Sir Simon Felbrigge, Knight of the Garter, of Felbrigg, Norfolk by Margaret, perhaps of Teschen, a kinswoman and lady in waiting to English queen Anne of Bohemia. They had no issue. He married secondly in 1438, Katherine de la Pole (1416–1488; buried in Rowley Abbey, Oxfordshire), daughter and heiress to Sir Thomas de la Pole (aft. 1397–1433), who died in France while a hostage for his brother William, son to Michael de la Pole, 2nd Earl of Suffolk. They had two known daughters, the eldest, Elizabeth Stapleton, married before March 1464, Sir William Calthorpe of Burnham Thorpe, Norfolk. The younger daughter, Jane (or Joan) Stapleton (d. 1519), married Sir Christopher Harcourt of Great Ashby, (Ashby Magna), Leicestershire (d. 1474) and remarried John Hudleston (Huddleston), of Millom Castle, appointed sheriff of Cumberland by the Duke of Gloucester and keeper and bailiff of the king's woods and chases in Barnoldswick, Yorkshire, steward of Penrith and warden of the west marches.

Activities

He was a Knight of the Shire for Suffolk, and for Norfolk also, and was High Sheriff of Norfolk and Suffolk in 1440. In 1441–2 Sir Miles Stapleton and Thomas Tudenham were summoned as Knights and M.P.'s for Norfolk to attend the Privy Council. In 1442 he also had a Royal Commission for the Safekeeping of the seas.

Stapleton was in the French wars, where he single-handedly took seven prisoners, for whom he was given a safe-conduct dated 22 June 1436/7 to take them into Flanders "pro finantiis suis" probably to get money for their ransoms. The following year he and his brother, Bryan Stapleton of Crispings, in Happisburgh, & Hasilden, Norfolk, received the thanks of the Privy Council in connection with a riot at Norwich.

Stapleton is mentioned in the 1449 poem Amoryus and Cleopes, as the patron of its author John Metham.

Arms and burial

His arms are recorded as Argent, a lion rampant sable.

Stapleton was buried in Ingham Priory, Norfolk, where there was once a monumental brass (now lost).

References

Bibliography 
 Hervey, William, Clarenceaux King of Arms, and John Raven, Richmond Herald, The Visitation of Norfolk, 1563 & 1613.
 Banks, Sir T.C., Bt., Baronia Anglica Concentrata; or Baronies in Fee, London, 1844, p. 267, where a summary pedigree appears for this family.
 Burke, John, and John Bernard, The Royal Families of England, Scotland, and Wales, with their descendants, Sovereigns and Subjects, London, 1851, vol.2, pedigree CXVII.
 Waters, Robert E.C, B.A., barrister of the Inner Temple,Genealogical Memoirs of the Extinct Family of Chester of Chicheley &c., London, 1878, vol.1, pps: 140 and 255.
 Flower, William, Norroy King of Arms, The Visitation of Yorkshire, 1563/4, London, 1881, p. 295.
 Rye, Walter, Norfolk Families, part II, Norwich, 1912, p. 845.
 Carr-Calthrop, Christopher William, CBE., M.D., Notes on the Families of Calthorpe & Calthrop, etc., Third edition, London, 1933, p. 43.
 Oxford University Press, The Dictionary of National Biography, Compact Edition, Oxford, 1975.
 Richardson, Douglas, Plantagenet Ancestry, Baltimore, Md., 2004, pps: 57 and 771.
 Richardson, Douglas, Magna Carta Ancestry'', Baltimore, 2005, pps. 41 and 896.

External links
 Stapleton @ Britannia.com

1408 births
1466 deaths
People from Bedale
People from North Norfolk (district)
Knights of the Garter
English MPs 1442
High Sheriffs of Norfolk
High Sheriffs of Suffolk